This I Gotta See is the third studio album by American country music singer Andy Griggs. Released in 2004 as his final album for RCA Nashville, the album produced three singles: "She Thinks She Needs Me", "If Heaven" and the title track. These first two singles each reached No. 5 on the Hot Country Songs charts, while the title track reached No. 58.

Four of this album's tracks have been recorded by other country music acts. "Careful Where You Kiss Me" by Lonestar on their 2006 album Mountains, and "No Mississippi" by Gary Nichols on his self-titled debut album, which was not released. Additionally, "My Kind of Beautiful" was recorded in 2008 by the group One Flew South on their debut album Last of the Good Guys, from which it was released as a single. Jason Aldean covered the title track on his 2009 album Wide Open.

Track listing

Personnel
Compiled from liner notes.

Musicians
 Bekka Bramlett - background vocals on "No Mississippi"
 Dan Dugmore - steel guitar, Dobro, 12-string electric guitar
 Glen Duncan - fiddle, mandolin
 Stuart Duncan - fiddle, mandolin
 Andy Griggs - lead vocals (all tracks), background vocals (tracks 1,5)
 Wes Hightower - background vocals (track 6)
 Donny Kees - hand claps
 Delbert McClinton - background vocals on "No Mississippi"
 Wendell Mobley - background vocals (tracks 1,2,4,5,7,8,9), hand claps
 Greg Morrow - drums, percussion
 Nashville String Machine - strings
 Steve Nathan - piano, Hammond B-3 organ, synthesizer, Wurlitzer electric piano
 Michael Omartian - piano, Hammond B-3 organ
 Michael Rhodes - bass guitar
 Brent Rowan - electric guitar, slide guitar
 Randy Scruggs - acoustic guitar, National guitar, slide guitar, banjo
 Russell Terrell - background vocals (all tracks except 10), hand claps
 Neil Thrasher - background vocals (all tracks except 3 and 10), hand claps
 Biff Watson - acoustic guitar

Technical
 Richard Barrow - recording
 Steve Marcantonio - mixing
 Ron "Snake" Reynolds - recording
 Randy Scruggs - production
 Hank Williams - mastering

Chart performance

Weekly charts

Year-end charts

Singles

References

2004 albums
Andy Griggs albums
RCA Records albums